Pir Chandam (also "Pir Chandan", "Pir Chandram") is a small village with a shrine dedicated to Sufi Pir Chandam. The village is to the east of Dakhan and to the north-west of Madeji in Shikarpur, Sindh.

References

Populated places in Shikarpur District